Sophie Braslau (August 16, 1892 – December 22, 1935) was a contralto prominent in United States opera, starting with her debut in New York City's Metropolitan Opera in 1913 when she was 21.

Biography
Braslau was born on August 16, 1892 in Manhattan, New York City to Abel Braslau and Alexandra Goodelman Braslau.

As a child, Braslau studied piano.  Her vocal talent was discovered by voice teacher Arturo Buzzi-Peccia, a family friend, who heard the little girl humming while she practiced piano.  Braslau herself claimed to be inspired to a singing career after hearing Alma Gluck, another student of Buzzi-Peccia.  She studied with Buzzi-Peccia for three years and then with a number of other instructors.  She auditioned for New York's Metropolitan Opera in April 1913, was promptly signed to a contract, and debuted in November of that year.  Her first leading role was in 1918 as Shanewis.

Braslau also sang in concert and toured widely and frequently, first in the United States and Canada, then in Europe in the 1920s, using a repertoire which included works in English, French, German, Italian, Russian, and Yiddish.

She retired from her full-time opera career in the late 1920s and performed very little as frail health brought her life to an early close.

Sophie Braslau died of cancer on December 22, 1935 in Manhattan.  At her funeral Sergei Rachmaninoff was an honorary pallbearer; the eulogy was delivered by Olin Downes, music critic for The New York Times.

Recordings
Braslau made a number of recordings for the Victor Talking Machine Company and Columbia Records, often featuring her longtime accompanist Louise Bloch; some of the recordings were reissued on LP and CD. Her friendship with George Gershwin led her to record "The Man I Love" for Columbia.

Note

References

External links

, her rendition of "Just Awearyin' for You"
Sophie Braslau in Discography of American Historical Recordings at UC Santa Barbara

1892 births
1935 deaths
American operatic contraltos
American people of Russian-Jewish descent
Deaths from cancer in New York (state)
Jewish American musicians
Jewish classical musicians
Singers from New York City
20th-century American women opera singers
Classical musicians from New York (state)
20th-century American Jews
Victor Records artists
Columbia Records artists